Hydrogen lyase may refer to:
 Ferredoxin hydrogenase, an enzyme
 Hydrogenase (acceptor), an enzyme